Valen Chapel is a parish church of the Church of Norway in Sveio Municipality in Vestland county, Norway. It is located in the village of Valevåg. It one of the churches for the Valestrand og Førde parish which is part of the Sunnhordland prosti (deanery) in the Diocese of Bjørgvin. The small, brown, wooden church was built in a long church design in 1707 using plans drawn up by an unknown architect. The church seats about 50 people. The small church is now only used for special situations, although it sits on a church site that has been in use for centuries.

History
The earliest existing historical records of the church date back to the year 1350, but it was not built that year. That first church in Valen was a wooden stave church that was likely built during the 13th century. In 1707, the old church was torn down and a new timber-framed long church was built on the same site. The new Valestrand Church was completed in 1873. The old church was then extensively renovated and turned into a schoolhouse. The school operated in the building until 1938. After that time, the building was renovated again and re-consecrated for church use on 31 July 1949 and is now known as Valen Chapel.

See also
List of churches in Bjørgvin

References

Sveio
Churches in Vestland
Long churches in Norway
Wooden churches in Norway
18th-century Church of Norway church buildings
Churches completed in 1707
13th-century establishments in Norway
1949 establishments in Norway